Lincoln Township is one of twelve townships in Hendricks County, Indiana, United States. As of the 2010 census, its population was 28,665.

History
Lincoln Township was organized in 1863.

Geography
The streams of Bullard Creek, Hughes Branch and West Fork White Lick Creek run through this township.

Cities and towns
 Brownsburg (southeast three-quarters)

Unincorporated towns
 Clermont Heights
(This list is based on USGS data and may include former settlements.)

Adjacent townships
 Brown Township (north)
 Pike Township, Marion County (east)
 Wayne Township, Marion County (southeast)
 Washington Township (south)
 Middle Township (northwest)

Cemeteries
The township contains twelve cemeteries: Bell, Brown, Brownsburg, Greenlawn, Hoadley, Lingeman, McDaniels, Prebster, Saint Malachy East, Turpin, Walker and Ward (historical).

Major highways
  Interstate 74
  U.S. Route 136
  Indiana State Road 267

Airports and landing strips
 Brownsburg Airport

Education
Lincoln Township residents may obtain a free library card from the Brownsburg Public Library in Brownsburg.

References
 
 United States Census Bureau cartographic boundary files

External links

Townships in Hendricks County, Indiana
Townships in Indiana